The 1987 NCAA Division II football season, part of college football in the United States organized by the National Collegiate Athletic Association at the Division II level, began in August 1987, and concluded with the NCAA Division II Football Championship on December 12, 1987, at Braly Municipal Stadium in Florence, Alabama, hosted by the University of North Alabama. The Troy State Trojans defeated the Portland State Vikings, 31–17, to win their second Division II national title.

The Harlon Hill Trophy was awarded to  Johnny Bailey, running back from Texas A&I.

Conference changes and new programs
One program departed Division II for Division I-AA prior to the season.

Conference standings

Conference summaries

Postseason

The 1987 NCAA Division II Football Championship playoffs were the 15th single-elimination tournament to determine the national champion of men's NCAA Division II college football. The championship game was held at Braly Municipal Stadium in Florence, Alabama, for the second time.

Playoff bracket

See also
1987 NCAA Division I-A football season
1987 NCAA Division I-AA football season
1987 NCAA Division III football season
1987 NAIA Division I football season
1987 NAIA Division II football season

References